The Galerie Vivienne is one of the covered passages of Paris, France, located in the 2nd arrondissement. The gallery has been registered as a historical monument since 7 July 1974.

History

The gallery was built in 1823 by Marchoux, President of the Chamber of Notaries, at the location of the Vanel de Serrant hotel and the Petits Peres passage.
It was based on plans drawn up by the architect . 
Inaugurated in 1826 under the name Marchoux, but soon renamed Vivienne, the gallery took advantage of its unique location. 
It attracted many visitors with its tailor shops, cobblers, wine shop, restaurant, Jousseaume bookstore, draper, confectioner, print-seller and so on.

Located between the Palais-Royal, the Paris Bourse (stock exchange) and the Grands Boulevards, 
the passage enjoyed considerable success until the end of the Second Empire. 
But the gallery lost some of its appeal with the move of the prestigious shops to the Madeleine and the Champs-Élysées,
and particularly because of the Restauration Haussmann of Paris by Georges-Eugène Haussmann. 
The gallery has been the scene of interesting events. 
The monumental staircase of No. 13 led to the former home of Eugène François Vidocq after his disgrace. 
The convict had become chief of a police squad made up of former criminals.

There has historically been competition with the newer, nearby . 
Since 1960 the gallery has once again become very active. 
It features fashion and home furnishings, and haute couture shows held there. 
The installation of Jean Paul Gaultier and  shops in 1986 helped with the resurrection of the gallery. 
It now houses many shops selling ready-to-wear and decorative items.

Galerie Colbert and Galerie Vivienne, were acquired by the Bibliothèque Nationale. Galerie Colbert houses the Institut National d'Histoire de l'Art.

Description

François-Jacques Delannoy conceived the decor in neo-classical Pompeian style covered with an elegant canopy, with mosaics, paintings and sculptures exalting trade. 
The restoration work rehabilitated the abundant ornaments around the half-moon windows, and the goddesses and nymphs that adorn the rotunda.
The mosaic floors are signed Giandomenico Facchina and Mazzioli. 
Their sobriety emphasized by the repetition of simple geometric shapes is reminiscent of the style of the mosaics of the Rue de Rivoli. 

Gallery

Location
 The gallery has entrances from the rue des Petits-Champs, rue de la Banque and rue Vivienne.

See also
 Passage des Panoramas
 Galleria Vittorio Emanuele II
 Galleria Umberto I

References

External links

Tourist attractions in Paris
Buildings and structures completed in 1823
Buildings and structures in the 2nd arrondissement of Paris
Covered passages of Paris